Carolyn F. Hugley (born May 2, 1958) is a Democratic member of the Georgia House of Representatives, representing the 136rd district since 1992. She is former Minority Whip.

External links
Georgia General Assembly - Representative Carolyn Hugley official GA House website
Project Vote Smart - Representative Carolyn F. Hugley (GA) profile
Follow the Money - Carolyn F Hugley
2006 2004 2002 2000 1998 1996 campaign contributions

African-American state legislators in Georgia (U.S. state)
Democratic Party members of the Georgia House of Representatives
1958 births
Living people
Women state legislators in Georgia (U.S. state)
21st-century American politicians
21st-century American women politicians
21st-century African-American women
21st-century African-American politicians
20th-century African-American people
20th-century African-American women